The 2010 Wirral Metropolitan Borough Council election took place on 6 May 2010 to elect members of Wirral Metropolitan Borough Council in England. This election was held on the same day as other local elections.

The council stayed under no overall control, with the Conservatives becoming the largest single party, and resulted in a new Lib-Con coalition.

After the election, the composition of the council was:

Election results

Overall election result

Overall result compared with 2008.

Changes in council composition

Prior to the election the composition of the council was:

After the election the composition of the council was:

Ward results
Results compared directly with the last local election in 2008.

Bebington

Bidston and St James

Birkenhead and Tranmere

Bromborough

Clatterbridge

Claughton

Eastham

Greasby, Frankby and Irby

Heswall

Hoylake and Meols

Leasowe and Moreton East

Liscard

Moreton West and Saughall Massie

New Brighton

Oxton

Pensby and Thingwall

Prenton

Rock Ferry

Seacombe

Upton

Wallasey

West Kirby and Thurstaston

Notes

• italics denote the sitting councillor • bold denotes the winning candidate

References

2010 English local elections
May 2010 events in the United Kingdom
2010
2010s in Merseyside